Sir Francis Geoffrey Jacobs  (born 8 June 1939) is a British jurist who served as Advocate General at the Court of Justice of the European Communities from October 1988 to January 2006. He was educated at the City of London School, and Christ Church, Oxford, where he read Mods and Greats (Classics), and Nuffield College, Oxford, where he read for a DPhil in Law. He practised as a barrister from Fountain Court Chambers in London. Jacobs has served as an official with the Secretariat of the European Commission of Human Rights, Professor of European Law at the University of London and Director of the Centre of European Law for King's College London School of Law. He is visiting professor at the College of Europe. He was appointed a Privy Councillor in December 2005.

On 4 December 2007, Jacobs was elected President of Missing Children Europe, the European Federation for Missing and Sexually Exploited Children.

He was President of the European Law Institute from 2011 to 2013.

He married  in 1975 (as his second wife) Susan Cox, granddaughter of Michael Gordon Clark; they have three daughters and one son. He has one son by an earlier marriage.

See also

List of members of the European Court of Justice

List of cases
Case C-251/95 Sabel BV v Puma AG, Rudolf Dassler Sport
Case C-412/93 Leclerc-Siplec [1995] ECR I-00179
Case C-34-36/95 De Agostini [1997] ECR-I 3843
Case C-409/95 Marschall v Land Nordrhein Westfalen [1997] ECR I-06363
Case C-405/98 Gourmet International [2001] ECR-I 1795

Notes

Further reading

1939 births
Living people
Alumni of Christ Church, Oxford
Alumni of Nuffield College, Oxford
Academics of King's College London
Academic staff of the College of Europe
Fellows of King's College London
English King's Counsel
Advocates General of the European Court of Justice
Knights Commander of the Order of St Michael and St George
Lawyers awarded knighthoods
People educated at the City of London School
Members of the Privy Council of the United Kingdom
British officials of the European Union